Venera 13 ( meaning Venus 13) was part of the Soviet Venera program meant to explore Venus.

Venera 13 and 14 were identical spacecraft built to take advantage of the 1981 Venus launch opportunity. The probes were launched five days apart, with Venera 13 launching on 30 October 1981 at 06:04 UTC and Venera 14 launching on 4 November 1981 at 05:31 UTC. Both had an on-orbit dry mass of 760 kg.

Venera 13 transmitted the first recording of actual sounds from another planet, including sounds of Venusian wind, the lander hitting the ground, pyrotechnic lens cap removal and its impact on regolith, and action of the regolith drilling apparatus.

Design
The descent lasted about an hour. Venera 13 landed at 03:57:21 UT at 7.5 S, 303 E, just east of the eastern extension of an elevated region known as Phoebe Regio. The area is composed of bedrock outcrops surrounded by dark, fine-grained soil.

Cruise stage
As the cruise stage flew by Venus, the bus acted as a data relay for the lander before continuing on to a heliocentric orbit. The probe was equipped with a gamma-ray spectrometer, UV grating monochromator, electron and proton spectrometers, gamma-ray burst detectors, solar wind plasma detectors, and two-frequency transmitters which made measurements before, during, and after the Venus flyby. "The bus continued to provide data until at least 25 April 1983."

Descent lander

The lander was a hermetically-sealed pressure vessel and contained most of the instrumentation and electronics. Mounted on a ring-shaped landing platform and topped by an antenna, the lander was designed similar to earlier Venera 9–12 landers. It carried instruments to take chemical and isotopic measurements, monitor the spectrum of scattered sunlight, and record electric discharges during its descent phase through the Venusian atmosphere. The spacecraft utilized a camera system, an x-ray fluorescence spectrometer, a screw drill and surface sampler, a dynamic penetrometer, and a seismometer to conduct investigations on the surface.

The list of lander experiments and instruments include:
 accelerometer, impact analysis - Bison-M
 thermometers, barometers - ITD
 spectrometer / directional photometer - IOAV-2
 ultraviolet photometer	
 mass spectrometer - MKh-6411
 penetrometer / regolith ohmmeter - PrOP-V
 chemical redox indicator - Kontrast
 2 color telephotometer cameras - TFZL-077
 gas chromatograph - Sigma-2
 radio / seismometer - Groza-2
 nephelometer - MNV-78-2
 hydrometer - VM-3R
 x-ray fluorescence spectrometer (aerosol) - BDRA-1V
 x-ray fluorescence spectrometer (regolith) - Arakhis-2
 regolith drilling apparatus - GZU VB-02
 stabilized oscillator / Doppler radio
 small solar batteries - MSB

Landing
On 1 March 1982, after launch and a four-month cruise to Venus, the descent vehicle separated from the cruise stage and plunged into the Venusian atmosphere. A parachute deployed once the lander entered the Venusian atmosphere.

The Venera 13 lander was equipped with cameras to photograph the surface and spring-loaded arms to measure the compressibility of regolith. The quartz camera windows were covered by lens caps that popped off after descent.

The landing area was composed of bedrock outcrops surrounded by dark, fine-grained regolith. After landing, the lander began to take a panoramic photograph while a mechanical drilling arm obtained surface samples. Sample composition was determined by the X-ray fluorescence spectrometer to be in the class of weakly-differentiated melanocratic alkaline gabbroids.

Although the lander was designed to function for about 32 minutes, it continued to operate for at least 127 minutes in an environment where the temperature was 457 °C (855 °F) and the pressure was 9.0 MPa (89 standard atmospheres). Data was transmitted by the lander to the satellite, which functioned as a data relay as it flew by Venus.

In order to measure surface wind speed, microphones on the probe recorded atmospheric wind noises (the probe also recorded noises associated with the probe's equipment). This was the first recording of sound on another planet. Venera 14 would also make similar recordings.

Suggested photographic evidence of life

Leonid Ksanfomaliti[:ru] of Space Research Institute of the Russian Academy of Sciences (a contributor to the Venera mission) and Stan Karaszewski of Karas, suggested signs of life in the Venera images in an article published in Solar System Research. According to Ksanfomaliti, certain objects resembled a "disk", a "black flap" and a "scorpion" which "emerge, fluctuate and disappear", referring to their changing location on photographs and traces on the ground.

Engineers familiar with the probe have identified the moving "disk" as actually being the two lens caps ejected from the lander. Rather than a single object that had moved between two places, they are simply two inanimate similar-looking objects in different places. The other "objects" are ascribed to image processing artifacts and do not appear in the original photography.

The editors of Solar System Research published an editorial comment and a number of commentary articles from other scientists in their September 2012 publication of Issue 5, Volume 46 of the journal. That issue also includes a second article from Ksanfomaliti, in which he claims to identify several other life forms and speculates regarding the apparent rich diversity of life around the landing site.

These claims have been refuted by the Live Science website.

Post encounter

The spacecraft bus ended up in a heliocentric orbit where it continued to make observations in the X-ray and gamma ray spectrum. To provide data for the later Vega mission the bus activated its engine on the 10 June 1982. The last data published for the probe is from 12 April 1983.

In fiction 
 The Venera 13 lander appears in the short film Horses on Mars (2001) with a message to the main character who is a microbe lost on Venus.
 The Venera lander appears in the book Contact (Sagan, 1985).

See also

 List of missions to Venus

References

External links

 Soviet Venus Images
 Venera: The Soviet Exploration of Venus
 On Ksanfomality's Venus Life Result
 

Venera program
Derelict landers (spacecraft)
Spacecraft launched in 1981
1981 in the Soviet Union